Nyamandlovu is a  rural district located roughly 40 km northwest of Bulawayo and in Matabeleland North Province. iNyamayendlovu loosely translated means "elephant meat" in the local language, isiNdebele.

The community is predominantly Ndebele and is dependent on rural farming and cattle rearing because the soil is rich and there is abundant underground water.

The land has been redistributed by government to local residents.

Populated places in Matabeleland North Province